Arsalan Arshad (born 30 May 1994) is a Pakistani cricketer. He made his first-class debut for Lahore Shalimar in the 2013–14 Quaid-e-Azam Trophy on 23 October 2013.

References

External links
 

1994 births
Living people
Pakistani cricketers
Khan Research Laboratories cricketers
Lahore Shalimar cricketers